Isaac S. Mackie (23 September 1880 – 22 June 1963) was a Scottish-American professional golfer who played in the late 19th and early 20th century. He apprenticed as a club maker under George Forrester. Following his brother Jack—who had emigrated to the United States in 1899—Mackie also made the trans-Atlantic journey in 1901. He took a job as professional at Fox Hills Golf Club on Staten Island soon after his arrival and remained in that post until 1914. In 1916, he was appointed the head professional at Canoe Brook Country Club, replacing Louis Tellier. In 1953 he was the head professional at Netherwood Golf Club in North Plainfield, New Jersey.

He was a frequent competitor in the U.S. Open, with at least 12 starts between 1901 and his final appearance in 1921. He won the 1914 Shawnee Open.

Early life and family
Mackie was born on 23 September 1880 in Earlsferry, Fife, Scotland. He emigrated to the United States in 1901, following his brother Jack who had moved to the United States in 1899. He grew to be a tall man of stout build. While in his early 20s he married Annie Schacht, a native-born New Yorker. His brother, Jack Mackie, was one of the early pioneers in American golf being one of the founders of the PGA of America.

Golf career
He accepted a job as professional at the Fox Hills Golf Club on Staten Island soon after his arrival and remained in that post until 1914. He played a match against Walter Clark in 1905, the result of which is unknown. On 13 July 1905 he won an Open Tournament at the Van Cortlandt Park links by shooting 152 on a course that had been soaked with rain. He held off joint second-place finishers Willie Anderson and Bernard Nicholls who finished at 157. It was the first ever professional tournament held on a public links golf course in the United States.

In a $500 four-ball match held on 26 August 1905 at Hollywood Golf Club in Deal, New Jersey, Mackie partnered with Willie Anderson of the Apawamis Club to defeat George Low and Bernard Nicholls. The winners were described as being "at the top of their game" as they played before a large gallery. The play was described by a writer for the New York Tribune as "the finest exhibition of golf that has ever been seen upon the course, and the match was greatly enjoyed".

Mackie was runner-up to George Low Sr. in the 1906 Metropolitan Open and was victorious in the 1914 Shawnee Open which was contested at The Shawnee Inn & Golf Resort in Smithfield Township, Monroe County, Pennsylvania.

Canoe Brook Country Club
Canoe Brook Country Club's original course was designed by Jack Vickery and his assistant Alex Smith. The first nine holes opened for play in 1902 and the second nine followed in 1905. In 1916, Canoe Brook hired Walter Travis to completely overhaul and extend the original course under the supervision of Mackie who was appointed as head professional to replace former French champion, Louis Tellier, the preceding January. By February 1953 he was the head professional at Netherwood Golf Club in North Plainfield, New Jersey.

1909 U.S. Open
In the 1909 U.S. Open, contested at the Englewood Golf Club in New Jersey, Mackie played very well and finished tied for fourth place. He shot rounds of 77-75-74-73=299, tying with Jack Hobens, and won $70. It was his best major championship finish in a long career that included at least 12 starts in the U.S. Open.

1920 PGA Championship
Mackie played in the 1920 PGA Championship, which was still a match play event at that time. In the tournament—played from August 17–21 at the Flossmoor Country Club outside Flossmoor, Illinois, a suburb south of Chicago—he lost his match 3 & 2 to George Thompson. Previously, Mackie had won the Eastern PGA Championship on his home course at Fox Hills in 1908, before the national PGA was founded.

WW I draft registration
Mackie registered for the World War I draft on 12 September 1918.

Death and legacy
Mackie died on 22 June 1963 in Scotch Plains, New Jersey. He was a frequent competitor in the U.S. Open in the early 20th century. He had a fine T4 U.S. Open finish in 1909 and was the winner of the 1914 Shawnee Open.

Results in major championships

Note: Mackie never played in the Masters Tournament.

NYF = Tournament not yet founded
NT = No tournament
DNP = Did not play
CUT = missed the half-way cut
R32, R16, QF, SF = Round in which player lost in PGA Championship match play
? = Unknown
"T" indicates a tie for a place
Yellow background for top-10

References

Scottish male golfers
American male golfers
People from Elie and Earlsferry
1880 births
1963 deaths